Clark Gayton is an American multi-instrumentalist, musician, composer and musicians' rights advocate.

Biography
Born as Carver Clark Gayton Jr. to Carver Clark Gayton and Mona Marie Lombard, Clark Gayton is a professional musician (trombone, euphonium, tuba, sousaphone, cornet, keyboards, piano), composer and producer.

Clark studied music with Floyd Standifer, JoAnn Christen, Curry Morrison, Julian Priester, Joe Brazil and Buddy Catlet while attending Garfield High School. After graduating from high school in 1981, Clark received a scholarship to attend the Berklee College of Music, where he studied with Phil Wilson, Tom Plsek and Tony Lada.  He graduated in 1984 and moved to Oakland before moving to New York in 1987 where he lives to this day.

Since living in New York, Clark has worked and recorded with some of the finest jazz musicians in the world, such as Charles Tolliver, Lionel Hampton, Wynton Marsalis and JALC, McCoy Tyner, The Duke Ellington Orchestra, the Mingus Big Band, Ted Nash and Odeon, Ben Allison & Medicine Wheel, the Carnegie Hall Jazz Orchestra, the Count Basie Orchestra, Clark Terry, Nancy Wilson, and Ray Charles. Clark toured with Bruce Springsteen as part of the Seeger Sessions band. Clark has recorded or performed with Prince, Rihanna, Brazilian Girls, Steel Pulse, Wyclef Jean, Queen Latifah, Quincy Jones, Sting, Sturgill Simpson, Whitney Houston, Stevie Wonder, Bruno Mars, Bette Midler, Nora Jones, Usher, Steve Van Zandt, Beyoncé, Santana, Maxwell, The Skatalites, and Bad Brains, to name a few. He performs regularly with his band, Explorations in Dub, at Nublu in New York City.  He was also a member of Levon Helm's Midnight Ramble Band. He has appeared in the movies Malcolm X, Sweet and Lowdown, and Kansas City.  He has performed frequently with Conan O'Brien's house band as a substitute for Richie "LaBamba" Rosenberg.  In addition, he is a strong advocate for musicians’ rights and has been a panelist for discussions about the online and independent music industry.

Family influence and early music history
He is the son of Carver Clark Gayton and Mona Marie Lombard and is the great-grand nephew of the legendary New Orleans musician, Manuel "Fess" Manetta.

The first two professionally trained musicians on his maternal side were Jules and Deuce Manetta who founded the Pickwick Brass Band and played cornet and trombone, respectively. Deuce, trained classically in France, was said to be the first slide trombone player in New Orleans. Valve trombone was the instrument of choice at the time. Their nephew was Manuel Manetta. He began on violin and guitar but did his first paid work as a pianist for Countess Willie Piazza. He played with Buddy Bolden in 1903. By 1910 he had mastered cornet, saxophone, and trombone. Manuel played at Tuxedo Hall with the Eagle band. He went to Chicago in 1913, then returned to New Orleans, played locally for five years. He went to Los Angeles in November 1919 to join Kid Ory. He returned home shortly afterwards and toured as pianist for with Martels' Family Band, then played piano in Ed Allen's Band on riverboats. He settled down in New Orleans where his versatility and musicianship enabled him to work with many bands and orchestras, including Papa Celestin's, Arnold Du Pas and Manual Perez's, and solo work at Lulu White's.

In later years he became the most renowned teacher in New Orleans. He gave occasional public appearances well into his seventies, making a specialty of playing two brass instruments simultaneously. Manuel had a sister, Olivia, who had a son, Lawrence (trombone), and three daughters: Lucille (Clark's grandmother, piano), Dolly (Adams, played all instruments, mother of Justin, Placide, and Gerry Adams), and Gladys (piano). All were born in Algiers.

It was reported in March 2023 that Gayton had recently suffered a very serious stroke. A GoFundMe page was set up to help raise money for his rehabilitation.

Discography
 Clark Gayton & Neatherealm – Don't Try To Question 1995 (Ritual, Ltd.)
 Neatherealm – JahMerican Jazz (Ritual, Ltd.)
 Clark Gayton – Walk the Water 1999 (Ritual, Ltd.)
 Clark Gayton – Sankofa! 2003 (Ritual, Ltd.)
 Clark Gayton – Best of Clark Gayton 2008 (Ritual, Ltd.)
 Clark and the SuperSlicks- “New York” 2013 (Ritual, LTD)

As sideman
 Steel Pulse Rastafarian Centennial (trombone, vocals) 1992
 Skadanks “Give Thanks” 1994 (trombone)
 Mingus Big Band “Que Viva Mingus” 1997
 Dr. John “Anotha Zone” 1998 (trombone)
 Cornell Campbell – Big Things (Trombone) 2000
 Peter Salett – Heart of Mine (Trombone) 2000
 Dennis Brown – Let Me Be the One (Trombone) 2000
 George Gruntz Concert Jazz Band – Merryteria (Trombone) 2000
 Monday Michiru – 4 Seasons (Trombone, Tuba) 2001
 Sting – All This Time (Trombone) 2001
 Maxwell – Now (Trombone) 2001
 Barney McAll – Release the Day (Trombone) 2001
 Monday Michiru – Selections 1997–2000 (Trombone, Tuba) 2001
 Jephte Guillaume Bourique Le 2001
 Paul Peress – Awakening (Trombone, Horn Arrangements) 2002
 Jah Works – Bassmentality (Trombone) 2002
 Dave Stryker – Blue to the Bone III (Trombone) 2002
 Tom Jones – Mr. Jones (Trombone) 2002
 Bill Mobley and the Space Time Big Band – New Light (Trombone, Soloist) 2002
 John Fedchock New York Big Band – No Nonsense (Trombone) 2002
 Queen Latifah – She's a Queen: A Collection of Hits (Trombone, Horn Arrangements) 2002
 Tom Browne – Tom Browne Collection (Trombone) 2002
 Gaijin à Go-Go – Happy–55–Lucky (Trombone) 2003
 Dan Zanes and Friends – House Party (Tuba) 2003
 Julia Darling – Julia Darling (Trombone, Trombonium) 2003
 Cannabis Cup Band – Live Joint (Trombone) 2003
 Mýa – Moodring (Trombone) 2003
 Sting – Sacred Love (Trombone) 2003
 Barbershop 2: Back in Business Original Soundtrack (Trombone) 2004
 Ben Allison & Medicine Wheel – Buzz (Trombone, Bass Trombone) 2004
 Mocean Worker – Enter the Mowo! (Trombone) 2004
 David Pilgrim – Island Soul (Trombone) 2004
 Brazilian Girls – Lazy Lover [EP] (Composer, Trombone, Vocals (background)) 2004
 Nasio – Living in the Positive [Bonus Tracks] (Trombone) 2004
 Brazilian Girls – Brazilian Girls (Composer, Trombone, Vocals (background)) 2005
 Ted Nash – Espada de la Noche (Trombone, Tuba, Horn (Baritone)) 2005
 JJ Sansaverino – Sunshine After Midnight (Trombone) 2005
 Elvis Costello – North (trombone) 2005
 Kerry Linder – Sail Away With Me (Trombone) 2005
 Steven Bernstein – MTO Vol. 1 (Trombone) 2006
 Brazilian Girls Talk to La Bomb 2006
 Joss Stone "It's a Man's World", Live (Trombone) 2006
 Rihanna – A Girl Like Me (Trombone) 2006
 Nasio Fontaine Rise Up (Trombone) 2007
 Duo Live The Color of Money (Trombone) 2007
 Bad Brains – Build a Nation (Trumpet) 2007
 Charles Tolliver – With Love (Trombone) 2007
 Bruce Springsteen – Live in Dublin (Trombone, vocals) 2007
 East Village Opera Company – Olde School (Trombone) 2008
 Brazilian Girls – New York City (Tuba) 2008
 Lila Downs – Shake Away (Trombone, valve trombone, tuba) 2008
 Dispatch – Live Zimbabwe (Trombone) 2008
 The Swell Season “Strict Joy” (trombone)
 GPSM Unit 2009
 Bruce Springsteen “Wrecking Ball” 2012
 Glen Hansard “Rhythm and Repose” 2012
 Sturgil Simpson “A Sailor’s Guide to Earth” 2014
 Bruce Springsteen – Live in Leipzig (Trombone, vocals) 2013
 Lucio Kropf – Pela Rua (Trombone) 2015
 Sting and Shaggy Trombone 2018
 Bruce Springsteen “Western Stars” (trombone) 2019
 Steve Slagle “Nascentia” 2021

References

Living people
Musicians from Louisiana
Place of birth missing (living people)
Year of birth missing (living people)
Berklee College of Music alumni
American trombonists
The Lounge Lizards members
E Street Band members